Ricardus Anglicus or Richardus Anglicus (also Richard the Englishman or Richard of England) may refer to:

Ricardus Anglicus (medical writer) (fl. 1180)
Richard de Morins (d. 1242), canonist, called Ricardus Anglicus
Richard of Wendover (d. 1252), physician, called Ricardus Anglicus
Ricardus Anglicus (alchemist) (14th century)

See also
Richard of England (disambiguation)